Sijan (also Romanized as Sījān) is a village in Nilkuh Rural District in the Central District of Galikash County, Golestan Province, Iran. At the 2006 census, its population was 132, in 28 families.

References 

Populated places in Galikash County